Adé ( or ) is a popular Nigerian given name or nickname, which means crown or royalty in the Yorùbá language. It is often short for names such as Adébọlá, Adéọlá or Adéwálé.
 José dos Santos Ferreira or Adé (1919–1993), Macanese writer
 Emmanuel Adebayor or Ade (born 1984), Togolese footballer
 Ade (actor) (born 1970s), English actor
 Ade Adebisi (born 1986), British-Nigerian rugby league footballer
 Ade Adepitan (born 1973), British television presenter and wheelchair basketball player
 Ade Akinbiyi (born 1974), English footballer
 Ade Alleyne-Forte (born 1988), Trinidadian sprinter
 Ade Aruna (born 1994), American football player
 Ade Azeez (born 1994), English footballer
 Ade Bethune (1914–2002), American Catholic liturgical artist
 Ade Candra Rachmawan (born 1992), Indonesian beach volleyballer
 Ade Capone (1958–2015), Italian comic book writer
 Ade Chandra (born 1950)
 Ade Coker (born 1954), Nigerian-American footballer
 Ade Dagunduro (born 1986), Nigerian-American basketballer
 Ade Easily, musician
 Ade Edmondson (born 1957), English comedian, actor, musician, and television presenter
 Ade Fuqua (born 1970), American civil servant
 Ade Gardner (born 1983), English rugby league footballer
 Ade Hamnett (1882–1956), English footballer
 Ade Hassan (born 1984)
 Ade Ipaye (born 1968), Nigerian lawyer and political appointee
 Ade Jimoh (born 1980), American football player
 Ade Jantra Lukmana (born 1990), Indonesian footballer
 Ade Mafe (born 1966), English sprinter
 Ade Mochtar (born 1979), Indonesian footballer
 Ade Monsbourgh (1917–2006), Australian jazz musician known as "Lazy Ade" or "Father Ade"
 Ade A. Olufeko (born 1980), designer, technologist, and entrepreneur
 Ade Ojeikere, Nigerian sports analyst and columnist
 Ade Orogbemi (born 1978), British wheelchair basketball player
 Ade Rai (born 1970), Indonesian bodybuilder
 Ade Schwammel (1908–1979), American footballer
 Ade Shaw (born 1947), musician
 Ade Iwan Setiawan (born 1984), Indonesian footballer
 Ade Solanke, playwright
 Ade Suhendra (footballer, born 1983), Indonesian footballer
 Ade Suhendra (footballer, born 1987), Indonesian footballer
 Ade Supandi (born 1961), admiral in the Indonesian Navy
 Ade Sutrisna (1974–2016), Indonesian badminton player
 Ade Renner Thomas (born 1945)
 Ade Tuyo, Nigerian businessman
 Ade Yusuf Santoso (born 1993), Indonesian badminton player

Yoruba given names